Juan Alfonso Armenteros (born 8 February 1958) is a Cuban rower. He competed in two events at the 1980 Summer Olympics.

References

External links

1958 births
Living people
Cuban male rowers
Olympic rowers of Cuba
Rowers at the 1980 Summer Olympics
Pan American Games medalists in rowing
Pan American Games gold medalists for Cuba
Pan American Games bronze medalists for Cuba
Rowers at the 1979 Pan American Games
Medalists at the 1979 Pan American Games